Sergio Corino Ramón (born 10 October 1974) is a Spanish retired footballer who played mainly as a central defender.

Club career
Born in Bilbao, Biscay, Corino was a product of Athletic Bilbao's prolific youth system at Lezama. He played nearly three seasons with the reserve side in the second division. On 18 October 1994, one week after his 20th birthday, he made his debut with the main squad, playing six minutes in a 2–3 loss against Newcastle United at St James' Park in the UEFA Cup (3–3 aggregate win).

In the 1996 January transfer window, Corino was loaned to CP Mérida also in La Liga, appearing regularly with the Extremadurans during the campaign and still managing to score three goals, but with his team being relegated. He then returned to the Basque Country for his first and only full season with the club, featuring sparingly (15 games, 18 overall) as it qualified for European competition after finishing sixth.

Still owned by Athletic, Corino signed for another team in the first division, UD Salamanca, being an undisputed starter and suffering relegation in his second year. Subsequently, he played a few months with RCD Espanyol after his release, then one and a half seasons with Athletic neighbours Real Sociedad.

Corino joined Rayo Vallecano in summer 2001, experiencing his best year in his first season with five goals in 28 games as the Madrid outskirts side finished comfortably in 11th position. In his final two campaigns, however, they were consecutively relegated into the third level, and the player retired from the game before completing his 30th birthday, having appeared in 283 matches as a professional over the course of 11 seasons.

International career
Corino was part of the Spanish squad at the 1996 Summer Olympics in Atlanta, appearing in two group stage matches plus the 0–4 quarter-final loss against eventual finalists Argentina.

Honours

Club
Espanyol
Copa del Rey: 1999–2000

International
Spain U21
UEFA European Under-21 Championship: Runner-up 1996

References

External links

1974 births
Living people
Spanish footballers
Footballers from Bilbao
Association football defenders
La Liga players
Segunda División players
Bilbao Athletic footballers
Athletic Bilbao footballers
CP Mérida footballers
UD Salamanca players
RCD Espanyol footballers
Real Sociedad footballers
Rayo Vallecano players
Spain youth international footballers
Spain under-21 international footballers
Spain under-23 international footballers
Olympic footballers of Spain
Footballers at the 1996 Summer Olympics